Aroideae is a subfamily of flowering plants in the family Araceae. It is the largest subfamily in Araceae and consists of about 72 different genera, and 2,300 species. Many Aroideae have spiny pollen grains without a sporopollenin outer exine layer and lacking an aperture.

Genera

Taxonomy

May be subdivided into a series of twenty five tribes:
 Aglaonemateae
 Anubiadeae
 Areae
 Arisaemateae
 Arisareae
 Arophyteae
 Caladieae
 Callopsideae
 Colocasieae
 Cryptocoryneae
 Culcasieae
 Homalomeneae
 Nephthytideae
 Peltandreae
 Philodendreae
 Philonotieae
 Pistieae
 Schismatoglottideae
 Spathicarpeae
 Stylochaetoneae
 Thomsonieae
 Zantedeschieae

References
 Bown, Deni (2000). Aroids: Plants of the Arum Family [ILLUSTRATED]. Timber Press. 
 

 
Alismatales subfamilies